Jungang Station is a station of Busan Metro Line 1 in Jungang-dong, Jung District, Busan, South Korea.

Station layout

Vicinity 
 Exit 1: 7 Eleven
 Exit 2: Kohler
 Exit 3: Sinchang Nursing Hospital, NHN Travel Doctor Busan Branch
 Exit 4: SK Energy
 Exit 5: HOLLYS COFFEE
 Exit 6: Taipei Economic and Cultural Office in Busan
 Exit 7: Busan Regional Fair Trade Office
 Exit 8: Yuseong Cafe, Jangchunhyang
 Exit 9: Busan Regional Fair Trade Office
 Exit 10: GS25
 Exit 11: BMW Dongsung Motors Busan Central Exhibition Center, Milhanzum Center
 Exit 12: Hanjin
 Exit 13: GS25
 Exit 14: Hanjin
 Exit 15: China Southern Airlines Corporation Busan Branch
 Exit 17: Hanwha Insurance Busan Central Branch

External links

  Cyber station information from Busan Transportation Corporation

Busan Metro stations
Jung District, Busan
Railway stations opened in 1987
1987 establishments in South Korea
20th-century architecture in South Korea